The City of Fairfax Historic District is a national historic district located at Fairfax, Virginia.  It encompasses 28 contributing buildings in the central business district of Fairfax.  Notable buildings include the Old Town Hall, which was built in 1900; the Barbour Building; First National Bank of Fairfax; Ford Building; Marsh House; McHugh & Hoffman Building; Rust Building; and Truro Church.  Located in the district are the separately listed Historic Fairfax County Courthouse, Old Fairfax County Jail, and Ratcliffe-Logan-Allison House.

It was listed on the National Register of Historic Places in 1987.

References

Historic districts on the National Register of Historic Places in Virginia
Queen Anne architecture in Virginia
National Register of Historic Places in Fairfax, Virginia